EasyBlog is a commercial open source software component software for the Joomla! Content Management System developed by Stackideas. EasyBlog was first introduced on May 19, 2010. EasyBlog is compatible with Joomla! versions 1.5, 1.6, 1.7, 2.5 and 3.0.x

Features
EasyBlog has a number of features including pre-built template styles to match with most Joomla! templates; social media sharing support; multiple blogger environment and RSS subscriptions. Some distinct features include:

 Remote blogging capability
 Email blogging
 Third-party SEF plugins
 Location service
 Comprehensive 3rd-party plug-in integration
 Zemanta integration
 Facebook and Twitter integration

Reviews
EasyBlog has been rated 4.99 out of 5.00 from 236 reviews  and remains one of the top-rated Joomla! Extensions featured on the Joomla! Extension Directory as of 26 September 2013. CGA Web Designs recommends EasyBlog for its clients given its ease of use, close integration, effective features and search engine optimization friendly. Users have also commended EasyBlog for having good customer support.

References 

Free content management systems
Free software programmed in PHP
Blog software
Content management systems
Website management